LOVE&PEACE is the second mini-album from Japanese singer Emi Tawata under the label Techesko. The album managed to reach the #204 spot on the Oricon ranking and charted for 2 weeks.
The mini-album had a collaboration song with DJ KAWASAKI named INTO YOU.
The leading song FLOWER was a theme song for television network series がっちりマンデー!!

Track listing

References 

2008 albums
Emi Tawata albums